Ab-e Narak (also Romanized as Āb-e Nārak; also known as Ab Anarak, Āb Anārak, and Āb-e Anārak) is a village in Ij Rural District, in the Central District of Estahban County, Fars Province, Iran. At the 2006 census, its population was 191, in 39 families.

References 

Populated places in Estahban County